Cardwell railway station is located on the North Coast line in Queensland, Australia. It serves the town of Cardwell. The station has one platform. Opposite the platform lies a passing loop.

Services
Cardwell is served by Traveltrain's Spirit of Queensland service.

References

External links

Cardwell station Queensland's Railways on the Internet

North Queensland
Regional railway stations in Queensland
North Coast railway line, Queensland
Cardwell, Queensland
Buildings and structures in Far North Queensland